The Yehimilk inscription is a Phoenician inscription (KAI 4 or TSSI III 6) published in 1930. Currently in the museum of Byblos Castle.

It was published in Maurice Dunand's Fouilles de Byblos (volume I, 1926–1932, numbers 1141, plate XXXI).

It is dated to the 10th century BCE, and contains the earliest known Phoenician reference to Baalshamin.

The earliest known Aramaean evidence of this god is found around 790 BC in the Stele of Zakkur.

Text of the inscription
The inscription reads:

{|
|+ 
|-
| (1) || BT Z BNY YḤMLK MLK GBL || [This is] the temple that he has built, Yehimilk, king of Byblos.
|-
| (2-3) || H’T ḤWY KL MPLT HBTM / ’L || It was he who restored all these ruins of temples.
|-
| (3-4) || Y’RK B‘L-ŠMM WB‘L(T) / GBL || May they [the gods] prolong —Baalsamem, and Ba'al(at) Gebal,
|-
| (4-5) || WMPḤRT ’L GBL / QDŠM || and the assembly of the holy gods of Byblos—
|-
| (5-6) || YMT YḤMLK WŠNTW / ‘L GBL || [may these gods prolong] Yehimilk's days and his years over Byblos,
|-
| (6-7) || K MLK ṢDQ WMLK / YŠR || because [he is] a just king and a righteous king
|-
| (7) || LPN ’L GBL QDŠM [H’] || before the holy gods of Byblos, he.
|}

Bibliography
 Christopher Rollston, "The Dating of the Early Royal Byblian Phoenician Inscriptions: A Response to Benjamin Sass."  MAARAV 15 (2008): 57–93.
 Benjamin Mazar, The Phoenician Inscriptions from Byblos and the Evolution of the Phoenician-Hebrew Alphabet, in The Early Biblical Period: Historical Studies (S. Ahituv and B. A. Levine, eds., Jerusalem: IES, 1986 [original publication: 1946]): 231–247.
 William F. Albright, The Phoenician Inscriptions of the Tenth Century B.C. from Byblus, JAOS 67 (1947): 153–154.

References

Phoenician inscriptions